Xinhua is a town of Xuanhan County in northeastern Sichuan province, China, located  northeast of the county seat. , it has one residential community (社区) and 10 villages under its administration.

References

Township-level divisions of Sichuan